Badil may refer to:
 Badil, Iran, a village in Khuzestan Province, Iran
 Al-badil (disambiguation), Arabic for the alternative
 Crystal violet, by the trade name Badil
 BADIL Resource Center for Palestinian Residency and Refugee Rights